Avenging Angel is a 2007 American TV Western film directed by David S. Cass Sr. It originally aired on Hallmark Channel on July 7, 2007, as part of the network's "Western Month". It was filmed at Simi Valley, California, Sable Ranch in Santa Clarita, California as well as Vasquez Rocks Natural Area Park in Agua Dulce, California.

Plot
A preacher (Kevin Sorbo) witnesses his family and a group of refugees seeking shelter in his church murdered by a gang of ruthless outlaws led by Colonel Cusack (Wings Hauser). After his wife makes him promise to never seek revenge, he instead becomes a bounty hunter. When he steps in to defend a woman in a saloon, the bad guy and his two friends (who happen to be allied with The Colonel), give him a beating and toss him into the street.

A woman with a "past", named Maggie (Cynthia Watros), takes him in to care for him. He stays in her extra room, but she insists he give up his gun while at her home because she has a daughter.

The local sheriff, on Cusacks's payroll, is meanwhile trying to run off some squatters. The Sheriff's gang attempts to intimidate the squatters, but once The Preacher learns of the Sheriff's and The Colonel's dealings, he visits the squatters, who tell him they paid for the land but never got the deed. A few days later the Sheriff's posse burns down a few of the squatter's tents.

The Preacher attempts to negotiate peacefully with the Sheriff, and so visits Cusack. Cusack tries to persuade The Preacher to join his mob, which he refuses. The Sheriff then sends a message to The Preacher by having some of his men rough up Maggie. Unarmed still because of his agreement with Maggie, The Preacher catches the gang in the act and overcomes one of the men's guns, scaring the men off.

The Preacher gets his gun back from Maggie and sets out to visit the Squatters again, and is met by the Sheriff and some of his gang. The Preacher, now armed, tells the Sheriff that the squatters have a right to stay. Gunfire ensues, and The Preacher shoots the sheriff. The rest of the bad guys run off.

The Preacher then pays a visit to Cusack for a final showdown, and obtains the deed for the squatters. As he turns to leave, having satisfied his purpose for the visit, the Colonel tries to shoot him, but The Preacher is faster and kills Cusack. The Preacher returns to Maggie and her daughter.

Cast
 Kevin Sorbo as The Preacher
 Nick Chinlund as Quinn
 Cynthia Watros as Maggie
 Richard Lee Jackson as Billy
 Wings Hauser as Colonel Cusack
 Joey King as Amelia
 Brad Carter as Gunman #2

The production designer was Scott H. Campbell, while casting was handled by Penny Perry and Amy Reese.

Reception
Avenging Angel did moderately well for Hallmark Channel when it premiered. The film scored a 2.6 household rating, making it the highest-rated ad supported cable movie for the day.  A reviewer at Chud.com called it: However, TrailerFan.com wrote that "Avenging Angel delivers the goods at point-blank range." The Variety review found it to be unoriginal stating "'Avenging Angel' feels less written than simply stitched together from pieces of classic oaters, without stretching much meat over those old bones."

References

External links
 
 Avenging Angel on Hallmark Channel
 
 Avenging Angel on Hallmark Channel's press site

2007 television films
2007 Western (genre) films
Films directed by David S. Cass Sr.
Films shot in California
Hallmark Channel original films
Squatting in film
American Western (genre) television films
2007 films
2000s English-language films